L'École des officiers de la gendarmerie nationale (EOGN, literally the "National Gendarmerie Officers' Academy"), the French Gendarmerie nationale Officers School, was created in 1901 and based in the Schomberg barracks in Paris. It provides a military education in order to train and teach military officers who enter the officer corps.

History 
In 1918, following the First World War, the school moved to Versailles and diversified by including in its ranks officers from other armies. It was not until 1937 that the school was given a flag. This emblem was officially handed over to the chef de corps, Colonel Picot, 14 July 1937, on the Champs-Élysées by the President Albert Lebrun. During the Second World War, the school moved to Pau then back to Paris before finding its current home in the Augereau barracks in Melun on 1 October 1945.

The year 2002 is particularly important for the history of the school. Indeed, from this date, recruitment is carried out directly by competitive examination for academics holding a master's degree. On 1 September 2008, it became the sole crucible for the continuous training of Gendarmerie officers, both in the operational and support fields.

A research centre was also created on 1 September 2008.

Application
Cadets are recruited through a national annual competitive exam, after previous graduate education. French students take exams on general knowledge, aptitude and intelligence; sit for an interview and pass a test of physical ability.

In addition, a number of foreign students are admitted annually.

Training
Gendarmerie Officers are intended to command security professionals within the operational units of the gendarmerie. Their training lasts 2 years (1 year for captains and students who have already graduated from other military academies), and is structured around 4 semesters :
 1st semester : military and tactical training with a view to acquiring the basics of command and developing the physical and moral qualities of future officers;
 2nd semester : vocational training (technical and tactical) adapted to the gendarmerie's framework of action and environment within society ;
 3rd semester : Professional training aimed at acquiring the tools and knowledge necessary for the implementation of gendarmerie resources by the future officer recognized as an expert in public security by the administrative, judicial, political and socio-economic authorities; at the same time, the officer can follow a university course leading to a master's degree;
 4th semester : specialization of training and preparation for the first commission as a leader in one of the four dominant job areas: 
 Public security,
 Riot control,
 Judiciary - Intelligence,
 Road traffic safety.

External links
 Official Site

 
Military academies of France
Military police academies